Quatretondeta is a municipality in the comarca of Comtat, Alicante, Valencian Country, Spain.

References

External links
 

Municipalities in the Province of Alicante
Comtat